Jean Evelyn Headberry (1911–1993) was an Australian registered nurse and midwife who was awarded the Florence Nightingale Medal in 1961.

Headberry served as an Army nurse during World War II.

Headberry was awarded a Centaur Memorial Scholarship in 1946 to study in England.

She later became the Dean of Royal Melbourne and Associated Hospital's School of Nursing.

References

 https://www.loc.gov/rr/frd/Military_Law/pdf/RC_May-1962.pdf
 https://trove.nla.gov.au/newspaper/result?q=Jean+Headberry

1911 births
1993 deaths
Australian nurses
World War II nurses
Australian midwives
Florence Nightingale Medal recipients
Australian military nurses